The Organization of Istanbul Armenians (OIA) is a non-profit organization located in Winnetka, California which is dedicated to preserving the Armenian heritage. It was founded in 1976 by a group of Armenians from Istanbul. This organization represents mainly the Istanbul Armenian community that is scattered throughout Southern California.

References

External links
Organization of Istanbul Armenians official website

Armenian-American culture in Los Angeles
Organizations established in 1976
1976 establishments in California
Winnetka, Los Angeles
Non-profit organizations based in Los Angeles